Song Li (born 10 March 1981) is a Chinese speed skater. She competed at the 1998 Winter Olympics and the 2002 Winter Olympics.

References

1981 births
Living people
Chinese female speed skaters
Olympic speed skaters of China
Speed skaters at the 1998 Winter Olympics
Speed skaters at the 2002 Winter Olympics
Sportspeople from Qiqihar
Speed skaters at the 1999 Asian Winter Games
Speed skaters at the 2003 Asian Winter Games
Medalists at the 1999 Asian Winter Games
Asian Games medalists in speed skating
Asian Games gold medalists for China
Asian Games bronze medalists for China
20th-century Chinese women
21st-century Chinese women